Werner Max Moser (1896 - 1970) was a Swiss architect whose most famous work is the modern campus of the Indian Institute of Technology Kharagpur. He was the son of Karl Moser also an architect and professor, who was one of the first Swiss modernists.

One of the characteristics observable in Werner Mosers buildings is their "human" and not monumental scale. Instead of overpowering masses and overwhelming dimensions, a more intimate result was to be achieved.  Moser was one of the leaders in this approach to humanize modern architecture. 

Moser was a founding member of CIAM.

References

1896 births
1970 deaths
Swiss architects
Congrès International d'Architecture Moderne members
Academic staff of ETH Zurich